Sharga Nature Reserve is a reserve in the western part of Mongolia. It comprises 2.860 km2 and is located in Govi-Altai Province in the area of the Sharga sum. The reserve has been created in 1993 together with Mankhan Nature Reserve to protect the endangered Mongolian saiga.

References 
 Mallon, D.P. and Kingswood, S.C. (compilers). (2001). Antelopes. Part 4: North Africa, the Middle East, and Asia. Global Survey and Regional Action Plans. SSC Antelope Specialist Group. IUCN, GLand, Switzerland and Cambridge, UK. 

Nature reserves in Mongolia